Tağlabiyan (also, Taglabiyan) is a village and municipality in the Ismailli Rayon of Azerbaijan.  It has a population of 322.  The municipality consists of the villages of Tağlabiyan and Kəlfərəc.

References

External links

Populated places in Ismayilli District